Scrobipalpa thymelaeae is a moth in the family Gelechiidae. It was described by Hans Georg Amsel in 1939 and is found on Sardinia and in Bulgaria.

The larvae feed on Thymelaea hirsuta.

References

Scrobipalpa
Moths described in 1939